Subwar 2050 is a futuristic 3D submarine simulator  computer game developed by Particle Systems, Michael Powell acting as the lead designer, and published by MicroProse Software, Inc.

Publication history
The game was released in 1993 for DOS and 1994 for Amiga and Amiga CD32. In 1994 an expansion pack, Subwar 2050: The Plot Deepens was released for DOS. Subwar 2050 was sold to Interplay Entertainment on 27 March 2009. In 2013 Subwar 2050 was released on Gog.com for XP/Vista/Windows 7 and is available for download.

Reception

Computer Gaming World in April 1994 said that "SubWar 2050 is a product with an identity crisis. It wants to incorporate sophisticated physical models of the type you'd expect from a true simulation, and yet it wants to have an action game's visuals and pace", citing its including thermal layers, making them "largely irrelevant" with visual-oriented combat, then only providing unsophisticated short-range torpedoes. In 1994, PC Gamer UK named SubWar 2050 the 18th best computer game of all time. The editors called it "a game that will appeal to almost everyone."

References

External links

1993 video games
Amiga games
Amiga 1200 games
Amiga CD32 games
DOS games
MicroProse games
Naval video games
Particle Systems games
Science fiction video games
Submarine simulation video games
Video games developed in the United Kingdom
Video games with expansion packs
Submarines in fiction
Games commercially released with DOSBox
Windows games
Video games scored by Allister Brimble

Interplay Entertainment games
Single-player video games
Video games set in the 2050s